Shahr-e Viran or Shahr-e Veyran may refer to:
 Shahr-e Viran, Bushehr
 Shahr-e Viran, West Azerbaijan